Fuzail Ahmad Nāsirī (born 13 May 1978) is an Indian Islamic scholar, Urdu writer and poet, who is a professor of hadith and vice-administrator of education at the Jamia Imam Muhammad Anwar Shah. He is an alumnus of Darul Uloom Deoband. His books include Hadīth-e-Ambar, Tafhīm-e-Ilhāmi and Tafhīm-ul-Maybzi. He has taught at Darul Uloom Azizia in Mira Road, Jamia Darul Quran in Sarkhej and Madrasa Faizan-ul-Quran in Saraspur. He is a recipient of Allama Iqbal Award.

Biography
Fuzail Ahmad Nāsirī was born on 13 May 1978 Nasir Ganj in Darbhanga, Bihar, India. He completed his primary studies with his father in Madrasa Mehr-ul-Uloom in Madhubani and was schooled at Madrasa Diniya Ghazipur, Uttar Pradesh and Madrasa Islamia in Darbhanga. He graduated from Darul Uloom Deoband in 1998. He benefitted from Kalim Ajiz in Urdu poetry.

Nāsirī began teaching in July 1999 at Darul Uloom Azizia in Mira Road, where he served for four years. In 2004, he moved to Ahmedabad where he served as a teacher of "dars-e-nizami" at the Jamia Darul Quran in Sarkhej and the Madrasa Faizan-ul-Quran in Saraspur for four years. In 2008, he became a teacher at the Jamia Imam Muhammad Anwar Shah. He serves as the vice-administrator of education and teaches hadith at the seminary. He regularly contributed to the Urdu Times as a columnist for two years and his articles  have also appeared in Roznama Inqelab. He received the Allama Iqbal Award in All India Quran Competition at Mumbai in March 2019.

Literary works
Literary works of Nāsirī include:
 Hadīth-e-Ambar 
 Tafhīm-e-Ilhāmi (Urdu commentary of Muntakhab al-Hussami).
 Tafhīm-ul-Maybzi (Urdu commentary of Maybzi).
 Pachasi Saala Funkaar: Apne Aayine Mai (a critical review of Wahiduddin Khan).

See also
 List of Indian writers

References

Bibliography
 
 

Living people
Scholars from Bihar
Indian Islamic studies scholars
Indian Sunni Muslim scholars of Islam
1978 births
Deobandis
People from Darbhanga
Urdu-language poets from India
Darul Uloom Deoband alumni